Akhtar Saeed Medical and Dental College (shortened as AMDC), established in 2008, is a private college of medicine, dentistry, physical therapy, and pharmaceutics located in Bahria, Lahore, Punjab, Pakistan.

Departments 

 Medical
 Department of Anatomy
 Department of Physiology
 Department of Biochemistry
 Department of Pharmacology
 Department of Pathology
 Department of Forensic Medicine and Toxicology
 Department of Community Medicine
 Department of Psychiatry and Behavioral Sciences
 Department of Ophthalmology
 Department of ENT
 Department of Medicine
 Department of Surgery
 Department of Obstetrics
 Department of Paediatrics
 Department of Orthopedic Surgery
 Department of Dermatology
 Department of Anaesthesia
 Department of Radiology
 Department of Cardiology
 Department of Plumonology
 Department of Nephraology
 Department of Gastroentrology
 Department of Endrocrinology
 Department of Urology
 Department of Neuro Surgery
 Department of Accident and Emergency
 Dental
 Department of Oral Biology
 Department of Oral Medicine
 Department of Science of Dental Materials
 Department of Community Dentistry
 Department of Oral Pathology
 Department of Prosthodontics
 Department of Orthodontics

See also
 Medical college in Pakistan

References

External links
 Akhter Saeed Medical and Dental College - Official Website

Medical colleges in Punjab, Pakistan
Universities and colleges in Lahore
Dental schools in Pakistan